Walter William Vassie Foster (June 19, 1908 – May 10, 1944) was a Canadian politician. He served in the Legislative Assembly of New Brunswick as member of the Liberal party from 1935 to 1939. He was the son of Walter Edward Foster.

Foster served with the Canadian Army Royal Canadian Artillery during World War II and died in combat.

References

1908 births
1944 deaths
20th-century Canadian politicians
New Brunswick Liberal Association MLAs
Politicians from Saint John, New Brunswick
Canadian military personnel killed in World War II
Royal Regiment of Canadian Artillery personnel
Canadian military personnel from New Brunswick
Canadian Army personnel of World War II